Joseph Freeman may refer to:

 Joseph Freeman (fencer) (born 1948), American Olympic fencer
 Joseph Freeman (Mormon) (born 1952), African-American Mormon religious leader
 Joseph Freeman (politician) (1765–1839), Canadian politician
 Joseph Freeman (writer) (1897–1965), American left wing writer and magazine editor

See also
Joseph S. Freedman (born 1946), professor of education at Alabama State University 
Joseph Friedman (1900–1982), American inventor